The Erza McKenzie Round Barn is a historic building located near Hazleton in rural Buchanan County, Iowa, United States. It was built in 1922 by Erza McKenzie for a dairy barn. The building is a true round barn that measures  in diameter. The barn is constructed of clay tile and features small cupolas on the west, southwest and south sides of the structure. The building features a two-pitch roof and a central silo. It has been listed on the National Register of Historic Places since 1986.

References

Infrastructure completed in 1922
Buildings and structures in Buchanan County, Iowa
National Register of Historic Places in Buchanan County, Iowa
Barns on the National Register of Historic Places in Iowa
Round barns in Iowa